beIN Sports Turkey is a Turkish network of sports channels owned by beIN Media Group and operated by Digiturk. It is the Turkish version of the global sports network beIN Sports.

History 
In 2000, it was purchased by Mehmet Emin Karamehmet under the name Işık TV for the Digiturk platform. In 2001, its name was changed to Lig TV by Mehmet Emin Karamehmet and Şansal Büyüka. In 2017, the name was changed again to beIN Sports by beIN Media Group. It is Turkey's first and only foreign-owned sports channel, holding the broadcasting rights of Süper Lig matches since the beginning of 2001 and broadcasting on the Digiturk digital platform.

Programming

Football
Turkey: Süper Lig, TFF First League
England: Premier League, EFL, EFL Cup 
France: Ligue 1, Ligue 2
Germany: Bundesliga, 2. Bundesliga
Australia: A-League Men

Basketball
Basketbol Süper Ligi

Tennis
ATP
WTA

Handball
France: LNH Division 1

References

External links
 
 
 
 

BeIN Sports
Television networks in Turkey
Television stations in Turkey
Sports television in Turkey
Television channels and stations established in 2017